James Noble may refer to:

 James Noble (actor) (1922–2016), American actor
 James Noble (American football) (born 1963), American football wide receiver
James Noble (clergyman) (c. 1876-1941), Australian missionary 
 James Noble (computer scientist), professor at Victoria University of Wellington, New Zealand
 James Noble (motocross), British motocross racer in 2008 FIM Motocross World Championship etc.
 James Noble (senator) (1785–1831), U.S. Senator from Indiana
 James Campbell Noble (1846–1913), Scottish painter
 James H. Noble (1851–1912), American physician and politician

See also
 James Noble Tyner (1826–1904), lawyer and U.S. Representative
 Jamie Noble (born 1976), American former professional wrestler
 Jim Noble (disambiguation)